Vulcaniella kopetdaghella is a moth in the family Cosmopterigidae. It is found in Turkmenistan.

References

Natural History Museum Lepidoptera generic names catalog

Vulcaniella